The 2023 Nigerian presidential election in Ekiti State was held on 25 February 2023 as part of the nationwide 2023 Nigerian presidential election to elect the president and vice president of Nigeria. Other federal elections, including elections to the House of Representatives and the Senate, were also be held on the same date while state elections will be held two weeks afterward on 11 March.

Bola Tinubu—the nominee of the All Progressives Congress—ultimately won the state by over 110,000 votes, a 36% margin, over runner-up Atiku Abubakar of the Peoples Democratic Party. The other two major contenders, Peter Obi (Labour Party) and Rabiu Kwankwaso (New Nigeria Peoples Party), trailed with just 3.7% and 0.09%, respectively.

Background
Ekiti State is a small, Yoruba-majority southwestern state with vast natural areas but facing an underdeveloped yet vital agricultural sector, high unemployment, and rising debt. The state also has to contend with insecurity with abated, but still present, conflict between herders and farmers in the state's rural areas.

The state's 2019 elections categorized by a massive swing to the APC as its presidential nominee Muhammadu Buhari won the state back after the PDP had won it in 2015. Legislatively the APC also gained ground, winning all two Senate seats, all six House of Representatives seats, and control of the House of Assembly. Two years later, Abiodun Oyebanji retained the gubernatorial office for the APC, winning with 53% of the vote.

Polling

Projections

General election

Results

By senatorial district 
The results of the election by senatorial district.

By federal constituency
The results of the election by federal constituency.

By local government area 
The results of the election by local government area.

Notes

See also 
 2023 Nigerian elections
 2023 Nigerian presidential election

Notes

References 

Ekiti State gubernatorial election
2023 Ekiti State elections
Ekiti